C58 or C-58 may refer to:
 C-58 (Michigan county highway)
 C-58 highway (Spain)
 , an Admirable-class minesweeper of the Mexican Navy
 Caldwell 58, an open cluster
 Choriocarcinoma
 Douglas C-58 Bolo, an American military aircraft
 , a Fiji-class light cruiser of the Royal Navy
 JNR Class C58, a Japanese steam locomotive
 Minimum Age (Sea) Convention (Revised), 1936 of the International Labour Organization
 Two Knights Defense, a chess opening